The following is a list of multi-purpose stadiums in Saudi Arabia, used primarily for association football. The minimum capacity is 5,000.

Current stadiums

New 2027 AFC Asian Cup stadiums

See also
 Football in Saudi Arabia
 List of Asian stadiums by capacity
 List of association football stadiums by capacity

References

Saudi Arabia
Football stadiums